The Tennessee Public Utility Commission (TPUC) is the Tennessee governmental unit charged with the responsibility of setting rates and service standards for privately owned telephone, natural gas, electric, and water utilities.

History
The Tennessee Regulatory Authority (TRA) was established on July 1, 1996, following the shutdown of the Tennessee Public Service Commission.

When established, the TRA was headed by three directors, with the governor, lieutenant governor, and speaker of the Tennessee House of Representatives each appointing one director. The initial directors were H. Lynn Greer, Jr., Sara P. Kyle, and Melvin J. Malone. In 2002 a fourth director was added by the Tennessee General Assembly, to be appointed by joint agreement among the governor, lieutenant governor, and speaker of the House. Each director serves a six-year term. After 2008 the terms were required to be staggered.

In 2012, Governor Bill Haslam proposed to eliminate the full-time TRA board, replacing the four-member board with a board of five part-time members to be appointed by the governor and legislature, plus a full-time paid executive director. On May 1, 2012, both houses of the General Assembly gave final approval to a bill to implement Haslam's plan. A principal rationale for the change was cost savings, as proponents said the TRA workload was not sufficient to justify the salaries for a full-time board; annual savings were estimated at $300,000. Opposition to the proposal centered on concern that it would weaken regulation of public utilities. Sara Kyle, one of the directors, resigned in protest at the changes, saying that "The present administration changed it to part-time, with the commissioners only working one day a month. They need full-time service."

In 2017, Governor Haslam proposed and the General Assembly passed legislation renaming the TRA to the Tennessee Public Utility Commission, bringing it in line with national standards and counterparts in other states.

Leadership

The current Executive Director of the TPUC is Earl Taylor. He was appointed Executive Director by Speaker Harwell, Governor Haslam, and Lt. Governor Ron Ramsey in 2012 and reappointed by the Commission in 2018 to another three year term.

See also
 Public Utilities Commission

References

External links
Tennessee Regulatory Authority
Tennessee Regulatory Authority in the Tennessee Blue Book
 Janice Beecher (Michigan State University), The All Commissioners List - List of all persons who had ever served as members of U.S. federal and state public utilities regulatory agencies through 2007

State agencies of Tennessee
1996 establishments in Tennessee
Government agencies established in 1996
Public utilities commissions of the United States